An intelligence agency is a government agency responsible for the collection, analysis, and exploitation of information in support of law enforcement, national security, military, public safety, and foreign policy objectives.

Means of information gathering are both overt and covert and may include espionage, communication interception, cryptanalysis, cooperation with other institutions, and evaluation of public sources. The assembly and propagation of this information is known as intelligence analysis or intelligence assessment.

Intelligence agencies can provide the following services for their national governments.

 Give early warning of impending crisis;
 Serve national and international crisis management by helping to discern the intentions of current or potential opponents;
 Inform national defense planning and military operations (military intelligence);
 Protect sensitive information secrets, both of their own sources and activities, and those of other state agencies;
 Covertly influence the outcome of events in favor of national interests, or influence international security; and
 Defense against the efforts of other national intelligence agencies (counterintelligence).

There is a distinction between "security intelligence" and "foreign intelligence". Security intelligence pertains to domestic threats (e.g., terrorism, espionage). Foreign intelligence involves information collection relating to the political, or economic activities of foreign states.

Some agencies have been involved in assassination, arms trafficking, coups d'état, and the placement of misinformation (propaganda) as well as other covert and clandestine operations, in order to support their own or their governments' interests.

See also
 Intelligence officer
 List of intelligence agencies
 List of defunct intelligence agencies
 List of intelligence gathering disciplines
 Security agency
 Secret police
 Secret service
 Counter-intelligence and counter-terrorism organizations

Further reading
Books
 Encyclopedia of Espionage, Intelligence, and Security, hrg. von K. Lee Lerner and Brenda Wilmoth Lerner, 3 Bände, Detroit [u.a.] : Gale [u.a.], 2004
 Rhodri Jeffreys-Jones, Cloak and Dollar: A History of American Secret Intelligence, Yale University Press, 2002
 Richard C. S. Trahair, Encyclopedia of Cold War Espionage, Spies, and Secret Operations, Westport, Conn. [u.a.] : Greenwood Press, 2004
 Amy B. Zegart, Flawed by Design: The Evolution of the CIA, JCS, and NSC, Stanford, Calif.: Stanford Univ. Press, 1999

Journals
 The Journal of Intelligence History

Reports
 Ruiz, Victor H., 2010. "A Knowledge Taxonomy for Army Intelligence Training: An Assessment of the Military Intelligence Basic Officer Leaders Course Using Lundvall's Knowledge Taxonomy". Applied Research Projects. Texas State University Paper 331. Txstate.edu

References

External links
Outsourcing Intelligence
Proposal for a Privacy Protection Guideline on Secret Personal Data Gathering and Transborder Flows of Such Data in the Fight against Terrorism and Serious Crime by Marcel Stuessi (archived 25 June 2008)
 The Literature of Intelligence: A Bibliography of Materials, with Essays, Reviews, and Comments
 International Intelligence History Association
 Rüdiger Bergien: Intelligence History, version: 1.0, in: Docupedia Zeitgeschichte, 3rd august 2021